The 2020–21 CAF Champions League knockout stage started on 14 May with the quarter-finals and concluded on 17 July 2021 with the final to decide the champions of the 2020–21 CAF Champions League. A total of eight teams competed in the knockout stage.

Times are GMT as listed by CAF (local times, even if not different, are in parentheses).

Round and draw dates
The schedule is as follows.

Format
Each tie in the knockout stage, apart from the final, is played over two legs, with each team playing one leg at home. The team that scores more goals on aggregate over the two legs advances to the next round. If the aggregate score is level, the away goals rule is applied, i.e. the team that scores more goals away from home over the two legs advances. If away goals are also equal, then extra time is not played and the winners are decided by a penalty shoot-out. In the final, which is played as a single match, if the score is level at the end of normal time, extra time won't also be played and the winners will be decided by a penalty shoot-out.

The mechanism of the draws for each round is as follows:
In the draw for the quarter-finals, the four group winners are seeded, and the four group runners-up are unseeded. The seeded teams are drawn against the unseeded teams, with the seeded teams hosting the second leg. Teams from the same group cannot be drawn against each other, while teams from the same association can be drawn against each other.
In the draws for semi-finals, there are no seedings, and teams from the same group or the same association can be drawn against each other. As the draws for the quarter-finals and semi-finals are held together before the quarter-finals are played, the identity of the quarter-final winners is not known at the time of the semi-final draw.

Qualified teams
The knockout stage involves the 8 teams which qualify as winners and runners-up of each of the eight groups in the group stage.

Bracket
The bracket of the knockout stage is determined as follows:

The bracket was decided after the draw for the knockout stage (quarter-finals and semi-finals), which was held on 30 April 2021, 15:00 CAT (UTC+2), at the CAF headquarters in Cairo, Egypt.

Quarter-finals
The draw for the quarter-finals was held on 30 April 2021.

Summary
The first legs were played on 14 and 15 May, and the second legs were played on 22 May 2021.

|}

Matches

Al Ahly won 3–1 on aggregate.

Wydad AC won 2–1 on aggregate.

2–2 on aggregate. Espérance de Tunis won 3–2 on penalties. 

Kaizer Chiefs won 4–3 on aggregate.

Semi-finals
The draw for the semi-finals was held on 30 April 2021 (after the quarter-finals draw).

Summary
The first legs were played on 19 June, and the second legs were played on 26 June 2021.

|}

Matches

Kaizer Chiefs won 1–0 on aggregate.

Al Ahly won 4–0 on aggregate.

Final

The final will be played on 17 July 2021 at Stade Mohammed V, Casablanca.

Notes

References

External links
CAFonline.com

3
May 2021 sports events in Africa
June 2021 sports events in Africa
July 2021 sports events in Africa